The pre-Parsian style (New Persian:شیوه معماری پیش از پارسی) is a sub-style of architecture (or "zeer-sabk") when categorizing the history of Persian/Iranian architectural development.

This architectural style flourished in the Iranian Plateau until the eighth century BC, during the era of the Median Empire. It is often classified as a subcategory of Parsian architecture.

The oldest remains of the architectural landmarks in this style are the Teppe Zagheh, near Qazvin. Other extant examples of this style are Chogha zanbil, Sialk, Shahr-i Sokhta, and Ecbatana.

Elamite and proto-Elamite buildings among others, are covered within this stylistic subcategory as well.

Gallery

References

See also
Iranian architecture

Architecture in Iran